Sudden Money is a 1939 American comedy film directed by Nick Grinde, written by Lewis R. Foster, and starring Charlie Ruggles, Marjorie Rambeau, Charley Grapewin, Broderick Crawford, Billy Lee and Evelyn Keyes. It was released on March 31, 1939, by Paramount Pictures.

Plot

Winning a $150,000 prize in a sweepstakes gives the Patterson family grand plans. Particularly head of the family Sweeney, a frustrated drummer who decides to reassemble his old college ragtime band.

Everybody begins spending money. Sweeney's wife Elsie enrolls in an art school, eager to become a painter. Her brother Doc begins gambling on horse races. Off to an expensive  finishing school goes the Pattersons' daughter, Mary, while son Junior is enrolled in a military academy. Grandpa Casey looks on with disapproval, believing the family should be more careful with its new windfall.

Sure enough, things go wrong. Sweeney takes a shine to a young woman called Yolo, who joins the band and immediately creates problems, her jealous ex-convict boyfriend even punching Sweeney in the nose. Elsie's art teacher disappears with her tuition fee. Mary's new beau Johnny Jordan and his father are appalled by the family's behavior, and she ends up expelled from school. Bit by bit, the family goes broke.

Grandpa gives them an "I told you so." But after he wins a small cash prize himself, the family begins once again thinking big.

Cast

References

External links 
 

1936 films
American black-and-white films
1930s English-language films
Films directed by Nick Grinde
Paramount Pictures films
American comedy films
1936 comedy films
1939 comedy films
1939 films
1930s American films